
Gmina Skrwilno is a rural gmina (administrative district) in Rypin County, Kuyavian-Pomeranian Voivodeship, in north-central Poland.

Villages
Gmina Skrwilno contains the villages and settlements of Baba, Borki, Budziska, Czarnia Duża, Czarnia Mała, Kotowy, Mościska, Nowe Skudzawy, Okalewo, Otocznia, Przywitowo, Rak, Ruda, Skrwilno, Skudzawy, Szczawno, Szucie, Szustek, Urszulewo, Wólka, Zambrzyca and Zofiewo.

Neighbouring gminas
Gmina Skrwilno is bordered by the gminas of Lubowidz, Lutocin, Rogowo, Rościszewo, Rypin, Świedziebnia and Szczutowo.

References
Polish official population figures 2006

Skrwilno
Rypin County